Frank Serratore (born August 24, 1957) is an American ice hockey coach, currently with the Air Force Falcons men's ice hockey team.  He formerly coached professional hockey  in the International Hockey League with the Minnesota Moose from 1994 to 1996.

Career
Serratore played two seasons with the St. Paul Vulcans of the Midwest Junior Hockey League and later joined the Western Michigan Broncos men's ice hockey program while earning his degree in physical education and athletic administration.  He also had a short stint with the Nashville South Stars of the Central Hockey League in 1981–82.

Serratore began his coaching career in 1982 with the Austin Mavericks (later the Rochester Mustangs) of the United States Hockey League.  After five successful seasons, he moved on become an assistant coach with the University of North Dakota Fighting Sioux for two seasons.  He then returned to the USHL for one season as head coach and general manager of the Omaha Lancers.  During his time in the USHL, Serratore won three league championships.  In 1990, Serratore was hired as the head coach of the University of Denver Pioneers and spent four seasons behind their bench.

Serratore made the jump to professional hockey in 1994 when he was hired as the head coach and director of hockey operations of the Minnesota Moose, an expansion team in the International Hockey League.  The Moose lasted only two seasons in Minnesota before relocating to Winnipeg, Manitoba.  Serratore remained with the Manitoba Moose as director of hockey operations for one season, but Jean Perron was brought by the new ownership group to replace him as head coach.

Since 1997, Serratore has been the head coach of the Air Force Falcons men's hockey team.  During his tenure, the Falcons have won five Atlantic Hockey conference championships.  He is also part of USA Hockey's development program and coached the United States Under-17 team to a gold medal at the Five Nations Tournament in Sweden.

Personal life
Serratore is a native of Coleraine, Minnesota and a graduate of Greenway High School.  He and his wife Carol reside in Colorado Springs, Colorado and have four children.  His brother Tom coaches at Bemidji State University.

Awards
1983–84 USHL Coach of the Year
1984–85 USHL General Manager of the Year
1990 Omaha Sportscaster Sportsmen of the Year
1989–90 USHL General Manager of the Year

Coaching record

Amateur

Professional

Collegiate

See also
List of college men's ice hockey coaches with 400 wins

References

External links
 Air Force profile
 

1957 births
Living people
Air Force Falcons men's ice hockey coaches
American ice hockey coaches
Bemidji State Beavers men's ice hockey players
Denver Pioneers men's ice hockey coaches
Ice hockey coaches from Minnesota
International Hockey League (1945–2001) head coaches
Manitoba Moose coaches
Nashville South Stars players
People from Coleraine, Minnesota
United States Hockey League coaches
North Dakota Fighting Hawks men's ice hockey coaches
Western Michigan Broncos men's ice hockey players
Ice hockey players from Minnesota